Aaron ben Moses ben Asher (Tiberian Hebrew: ʾAhărōn ben Mōše ben ʾĀšēr; 10th century, died c.960) was a Jewish scribe who lived in Tiberias in northern Israel and refined the Tiberian system of writing vowel sounds in Hebrew, which is still in use today, and serves as the basis for grammatical analysis.

Background 
For over a thousand years ben Asher has been regarded by Jews of all streams as having produced the most accurate version of the Masoretic Text. Since his day, both handwritten manuscripts of the Hebrew Bible and printed versions strove to follow his system and continue to do so. He lived and worked in the city of Tiberias on the western shore of the Sea of Galilee.

Ben Asher was descended from a long line of Masoretes, starting with someone called Asher, but nothing is known about them other than their names. His father, Moses ben Asher, is credited with writing the Cairo Codex of the Prophets (895 CE). If authentic, it is among the oldest manuscripts containing a large proportion of the Hebrew Bible. Umberto Cassuto used this manuscript as the basis of his edition of the Hebrew Bible. Aaron ben Asher himself added vowelization and cantillation notes, and mesorah to the Aleppo Codex, correcting its letter-text according to the masorah.

Maimonides accepted the views of ben Asher only in regard to open and closed sections, but apparently admired his work generally and helped to establish and spread his authority. Referring to a Bible manuscript then in Egypt, Maimonides wrote: "All relied on it, since it was corrected by ben Asher and was worked on and analyzed by him for many years, and was proofread many times in accordance with the masorah, and I based myself on this manuscript in the Sefer Torah that I wrote".

First serious scribe 
Aaron ben Moses ben Asher was the first to take Hebrew grammar seriously. He was the first systematic Hebrew grammarian. His Sefer Dikdukei ha-Te'amim (Grammar or Analysis of the Accents) was an original collection of grammatical rules and masoretic information. Grammatical principles were not at that time considered worthy of independent study. The value of this work is that the grammatical rules presented by ben Asher reveal the linguistic background of vocalization for the first time. He had a tremendous influence on subsequent Biblical grammar and scholarship.

A rival system of note was that developed by the school of ben Naphtali.

Was ben Asher a Karaite? 

Scholars have long debated as to whether Aaron ben Asher was a Karaite. While many modern scholars lean toward this being true, there is no clear consensus and thus the question remains open.

The idea was first suggested in 1860 by Simhah Pinsker, who argued that Masoretes in general should be ‘suspected’ of being Karaites since they seem to have devoted all of their time to the Bible and showed no interest in rabbinic Midrash or Talmud, which at times contradicts the Masoretic Text. Numerous other pieces of circumstantial evidence were presented to make a strong case, however not strong enough to tip the scales and end the debate.

Some examples of evidence include the following:

 strong parallels to Karaite theology in the way both Aaron and his father Moshe write about all three parts of the Hebrew Bible being equally authoritative in terms of halakha (a classic Karaite position);
 the Masoretic Text does not follow the order set down in the Talmud (Isaiah after Ezekiel), which was accepted as authoritative by Rabbanites, but rejected by the Karaites (the Masoretic Text also differs from verses quoted in the talmud);
 the Codex contains a prayer for the protection of the temple, presumably referring to the Karaite temple, as the Rabbanites did not have a temple at the time;
 writings of the time refer to the Ben Ashers with honorifics more typically used by Karaites (such as melamed "teacher" & maskil "enlightened one");
 indications that the Codex Cairensis (thought to have been written by his father) was sponsored by a Karaite (based on language used by the sponsor);
 the fact that the Codex was in the possession of the Karaites (since the time of its inscribed dedication, I.E. even before they ransomed it from the crusades).

A turning point came in the 1950s when Benjamin Klar discovered that an anti-Karaite polemical poem by Sa‘adia Gaon criticized a Karaite masorete by the name of "ben Asher". This agrees with Sa‘adia's rejection of ben Asher in favor of ben Naftali, as well as the fact that ben Asher became accepted as relations between the Karaites and Rabbanites improved. Aron Dotan has dealt with many of the arguments, including Klar's, and also argued that the approval of Maimonides is evidence against the claim. However, according to Zer, few researchers have expressed their support for Dotan's position.

Footnotes

See also 
 Aleppo Codex
 Leningrad Codex

References

Further reading 
 Aaron Dotan, "Was Aharon Ben Asher Indeed a Karaite?" (Hebrew), in S.Z. Leiman, The Canon and Masorah of the Hebrew Bible: An Introductory Reader (New York: Ktav, 1974).
 Aaron Dotan, "Ben Asher's Creed" (Missoula, Montana: Scholars Press, 1977).
 Rafael Zer, "Was the Masorete of the Keter a Rabbanite or Karaite?", Sefunot 23 (2003) Pages 573-587 (Hebrew)

External links 
Aaron ben Moses ben Asher
Was the Masorete of the Aleppo Codex of Rabbanite or of Karaite Origin? Zer

10th-century rabbis
Grammarians of Hebrew
Linguists of Hebrew
Jewish grammarians
Jewish scribes (soferim)
Medieval Hebraists
Orthographers
People from Tiberias